is a retired Japanese rugby union player. He played as a lock and occasional flanker. He was born in Christchurch, New Zealand.

Thompson started his career with Canterbury in New Zealand, but after his route to the team was blocked by the return of Brad Thorn and the presence of Chris Jack, he signed for the Sanyo Wild Knights in 2004. He has since moved to play for the Kintetsu Liners where he played until his retirement.

International 
He then became a regular member of the side for all of John Kirwan's reign as Japan coach between 2007 and 2011 representing them at two World Cups. In the 2007 tournament he notably scored 2 tries as Japan pushed  close.

After the 2011 Rugby World Cup, he was left out of the Japan squad for the 2012 Asian 5 Nations by new Japan coach Eddie Jones who had decided to have fewer foreigners in the team than his predecessor Kirwan.

In 2013 he was retained in Japan's wider 41 man training squad for the Asian 5 Nations and Pacific Nations Cup, but was cut from the squad when it was trimmed.

Thompson obtained Japanese citizenship in July 2011 after 7 years in Japan, and is well settled. His sister Anna Thompson is a member of the New Zealand national netball team, the Silver Ferns.

During the 2015 Rugby World Cup, Thompson was part of a successful campaign by the Japanese rugby team, where they achieved three wins including against two-time world champions, South Africa. He was also part of the Japanese team in 2019 World Cup, when as hosts they beat Ireland, ranked second in the world at that time, 19-12.[14]

References

Luke Thompson's father is former Canterbury Stalwart, Dave Thompson who had an impressive Canterbury career at Representative level

External links
Luke Thompson International Statistics

1981 births
Living people
Japanese rugby union players
New Zealand rugby union players
Rugby union locks
Japan international rugby union players
Hanazono Kintetsu Liners players
Saitama Wild Knights players
Canterbury rugby union players
New Zealand emigrants to Japan
New Zealand expatriate rugby union players
Expatriate rugby union players in Japan
Naturalized citizens of Japan
Rugby union players from Christchurch
Sunwolves players
Urayasu D-Rocks players